Washington Luiz Pereira dos Santos (born 10 April 1975) is a Brazilian football player who currently plays as a striker for Nacional Futebol Clube. He formerly played in Brazil, Belgium, Paraguay, Japan, Honduras and Hong Kong.

Club statistics

References

External links

Cerezo Osaka
Washington Luiz Pereira dos Santos at HKFA

1975 births
Living people
Brazilian footballers
Brazilian expatriate footballers
Paraná Clube players
Cerezo Osaka players
Clube Atlético Mineiro players
São Raimundo Esporte Clube footballers
Club Guaraní players
Sportivo Luqueño players
Sport Club Internacional players
C.D. Marathón players
Happy Valley AA players
América Futebol Clube (SP) players
América Futebol Clube (MG) players
Rio Branco Esporte Clube players
Clube do Remo players
Expatriate footballers in Belgium
Expatriate footballers in Japan
Expatriate footballers in Paraguay
Expatriate footballers in Honduras
Expatriate footballers in Hong Kong
J1 League players
Association football forwards
Footballers from São Paulo